The 1953 Florida State Seminoles football team represented Florida State University in the 1953 college football season. In 1953, Tom Nugent, the creator of the I formation, became head coach and led the team to a 5–5 record. He was coach for six years, and compiled a 34–28–1 record.

Schedule

References

Florida State
Florida State Seminoles football seasons
Florida State Seminoles football